Prayag Ghat Kanpur Intercity Express is an Express train belonging to North Central Railway zone of Indian Railways that run between Prayag Ghat Terminal and  in Uttar Pradesh state of India. this train comes under the Intercity Express category.

Background
This train was inaugurated on 3 July 2016, flagged off by Murli Manohar Joshi, MP from Kanpur for more connectivity between Allahabad and Kanpur.

Service
This train covers the distance of 212 km with an average speed of 42 km/h on both sides.

Routes
This train passes through , Phaphamau,lalgopalganj,Unchahar &  on both sides.

Traction

As the route is fully electrified, Electric Loco Shed, based WAP-4[wap7] locomotive powers the train from Kanpur  to Prayag Ghat

External links
 14101 Intercity Express
 14102 Intercity Express

References

Intercity Express (Indian Railways) trains
Trains from Allahabad
Trains from Kanpur